Mods Carve the Pig: Assassins, Toads and God's Flesh is the second album by Kalamazoo-based progressive metal band Thought Industry. It was released in 1993 on Metal Blade Records and featured cover art from the Apotheosis of Homer by Spanish surrealist Salvador Dalí.  Mods is the final Thought Industry release to include co-founder Dustin Donaldson.

Track listing
All songs written by Dustin Donaldson, Brent Oberlin, Christopher Lee, and Paul Enzio. Lyrics by Brent Oberlin.
 Horsepowered - 3:06
 Daterape Cookbook - 4:34
 Gelatin - 4:36
 Jane Whitfield is Dead - 4:40
 Boil - 5:47
 Michigan Jesus - 1:46
 Smirk the Godblender - 5:57
 Republicans in Love - 6:14
 Worms Listen - 5:18
 Patiently Waiting for Summer - 6:29
 To Build a Better Bulldozer - 6:43

Personnel
Dustin Donaldson - acoustic and electronic drums, percussion, metals, objects
Brent Oberlin - vocals, fretted and fretless bass guitar, keyboards, harmonica
Christopher Lee - left side fretless and standard guitars
Paul Enzio - right side 6, 7 and 12 string guitars
Ken Marshall and Thought Industry - production

References

Thought Industry albums
1993 albums